Seanor may refer to:

Seanor, Pennsylvania, a community in Somerset County
James Seanor, a Union Navy sailor